The Lostwood National Wildlife Refuge is located in the U.S. state of North Dakota. The refuge manages two other refuges and two wetland management districts. The refuge also includes the Lostwood Wilderness which comprises almost a quarter of all the area of the refuge. The refuge is considered a prime migratory and nesting bird sanctuary with over 250 different species identified and tens of thousands of birds using the refuge annually. In 1964, the once believed to be extinct giant Canada goose (Branta canadensis maxima) a subspecies of the better known and much more common Canada goose, was reintroduced into the refuge, and their numbers have greatly increased. Additionally, numerous mammal species reside on the refuge, the largest being the moose.

The refuge is managed by the Lostwood Wetland Management District.

References

External links
 
 

National Wildlife Refuges in North Dakota
Protected areas of Burke County, North Dakota
Protected areas of Mountrail County, North Dakota